Svetlana Alekseyeva (born 13 March 1970) is a Belarusian diver. She competed at the 1996 Summer Olympics and the 2000 Summer Olympics.

References

1970 births
Living people
Belarusian female divers
Olympic divers of Belarus
Divers at the 1996 Summer Olympics
Divers at the 2000 Summer Olympics
Sportspeople from Minsk